Kropachyovo is an urban-type settlement in Ashinsky District of Chelyabinsk Oblast, Russia. Population:

References

Notes

Sources

Urban-type settlements in Chelyabinsk Oblast